The 2019 Women's World Junior Team Squash Championships was held in Kuala Lumpur, Malaysia. The event took place from 5 to 9 August 2019.

The defending champions of this tournament is Egypt women's team that won against Malaysia in the 2017 edition.

Seeds

Group stage

Pool A

Pool B

Pool C

Pool D

Playoffs

13th to 18th place

9th to 12th place

1st to 8th place 

5th to 8th place bracket

Quarterfinals

Semifinals

Final

Final standing

See also
2019 Women's World Junior Squash Championships

References

External links 
World Junior Squash Championships 2019 Official Website
World Junior Squash Championships 2019 SquashInfo Page

W
Squash tournaments in Malaysia
2019 in Malaysian women's sport
World Junior Squash Championships
International sports competitions hosted by Malaysia
August 2019 sports events in Malaysia